The Dawn of Liberty Party (DLP) is a classical liberal, self-proclaimed alt-right political party in South Korea founded in 2018 by Park Kyŏl.

History 
The party was founded on 10 July 2018 by Park Kyŏl, who is also the president of a resting place named Lounge Liberty. During this time, it was not officially a political party yet. The official formation was on 9 July 2019, and was officially registered under National Election Commission 6 days after the official establishment.

The party participated in the 2020 election. Its president, Park Kyŏl, declared to run for a seat in the Jongro District of Seoul, rather than for a proportional representation seat.

Ideology 
The party criticises Liberty Korea Party as "too left-leaning" and "similar to Democratic Party of Korea". It declares itself as "the first right-liberal political party of South Korea". Although the party does not agree with the illegalisation of same-sex marriage as a "liberal" party, the party also does not support the Anti-discrimination Law that could prohibit the criticisms toward the issue.

It also seeks to prioritise the locals, and says that the government should not simply give citizenship to any foreigners that can "pollute" the locals.

Its economic policies are also of a liberal market economy, calling for the private ownership of property, freedom of contract, tax cuts, and the abolition of inheritance tax. The party opposes the government interventions, mentioning that the planned economy cannot overtake the market economy. It also criticises trade unions who "prevent the new employments".

Unlike the other right-wing parties, i.e. Liberty Korea Party and/or Our Republican Party whose supporters are usually older than 50, the Dawn of Liberty Party mainly targets young voters in their 20s and 30s. The party wants to lower the minimum age requirement to become the President of the Republic, citing examples such as Emmanuel Macron (who became President of France at 39) and Jacinda Ardern (who became Prime Minister of New Zealand at 37).

Elections results

See also 
 Liberal parties by country
 Liberalism in South Korea
 Antifeminism
 Alt-lite
 Angry young man (South Korea)

References 

Anti-communist parties
Alt-right in Asia
Alt-right organizations
Classical liberal parties
Conservative liberal parties
Conservative parties in South Korea
Far-right politics in South Korea
Identity politics in Korea
Korean nationalist parties
Liberal parties in South Korea
National conservative parties
National liberal parties
Political parties established in 2018
Right-libertarianism
Right-wing populism in South Korea
Right-wing populist parties
Social conservative parties